Lonwolwol was a village on the island Ambrym in  Vanuatu.

Destruction
The village had a hospital that was destroyed in a volcanic eruption in 1913. As a result of the eruption a new lake called Lake Fanteng has been formed partially on the site of the former village.

References

Populated places in Vanuatu
Malampa Province